is a third-class airport located on Yoronjima (Yoron Island) in Kagoshima Prefecture Japan.

History
On 12 May 2005, the runway was strengthened to enable operations by the Bombardier Dash 8 aircraft.

Airlines and destinations

References

External links

 Yoron Airport Guide from Japan Airlines
 
 

Airports in Kagoshima Prefecture